Aloa ihlei is a moth of the family Erebidae. It was described by Karel Černý in 2009 and is endemic to Thailand.

References

External links

Moths described in 2009
Endemic fauna of Thailand
Erebid moths of Asia